Street Society is a 2014 Indonesian auto action film, starring Marcel Chandrawinata and Chelsea Islan. It was distributed by Ewis Pictures and directed by Awi Suryadi.

Plot
Cocky, charismatic, and womanizing Rio (Marcel Chandrawinata) is the reigning champion of Indonesia's illegal street racing scene. Along with his friends—tuning genius Monty (Daniel Topan), Balinese champion racer Gde (Yogie Tan), and the beautiful-yet-brash Nanda (Kelly Tandiono)—Rio forms a speed-obsessed society to race against fellow supercar owners in exotic and beautiful locations across the country. Rio's archenemy is Nico (Edward Gunawan), the heavily-guarded heir to a Surabaya crime syndicate—and the city's No. 1 racer. Nico keeps pushing Rio for a rematch after an embarrassing loss on Rio's home turf.

Rio's priorities begin to change after he meets the beautiful and intellectual Karina (Chelsea Islan). Karina is an up-and-coming DJ who plays at one of Rio's regular hangouts. Their friendship soon blossoms into something more serious. For the first time in his life, Rio feels he can focus on something other than racing. After a race ends with a near-death incident that shocks Karina, Rio decides to put his racing days behind him, at least until nervy racer Yopie (Edward Akbar) enters the scene. Yopie bears a violent hatred toward Nico. Yopie and his family blame Nico for the death of their father, a notorious mobster in the late 1990s. His only chance for payback is by taking down Nico in a road race, the only place where the latter is not surrounded by his horde of bodyguards. Yopie forces Rio to take the wheel against Nico for one last time, or else Karina will be a victim of Yopie's violent tendencies.

Cast

Stars 

 Marcel Chandrawinata as Rio
 Chelsea Islan as Karina

Supporting Cast 

 Edward Gunawan as Nico
 Edward Akbar as Yopie
 Daniel Topan as Monty
 Yogie Tan as Gde
 Kelly Tandiono as Nanda
 Ferry Salim as Frankie
 Moudy Milinka as Aline
 Dimas Argobie as Bram
 Marcellino Lefrandt as Marco
 Wulan Guritno as Aisha 
 Avrilla Sigarlaki as Key

Cameos 

 Senk Lottaas The Next Girl 
 Leroy Osmani
 Billy W. Polii
 Roro Fitria

Soundtrack and score

Album 
Original Motion Picture Soundtrack "Street Society"

Single 
 "Secepat Kilat", by Nidji
 "Faster Than Light", by Edward Akbar/CrazyED
 "Am With You", by Ape On The Roof

Score 

 "Street Society", by Dj Winky Wiryawan & Dj Evan Virgan
 "Rio & Nico", by Aghi Narottama
 "The Team", by Aghi Narottama
 "The Suramadu Race", by Aghi Narottama
 "2am Beats", by Aghi Narottama
 "Monty's Mirrage of Figaro", by Aghi Narottama
 "The Night is Young", by Aghi Narottama

References

External links
  

2014 films
Indonesian action films
2014 action films
Films directed by Awi Suryadi